USS Hugh L. Scott (AP-43) was a  ship. She was built in 1921 and spent 20 years in merchant service as a passenger and cargo liner. In July 1941 the ship was delivered to the United States Department of War for Army service as the United States Army Transport Hugh L. Scott operating in the Pacific. In August 1942 the ship was transferred to the United States Navy for conversion to an attack transport, served as a troopship in Operation Torch in November 1942, and was sunk by a U-boat four days later. 59 crewmen and soldiers died during the sinking.

Construction
The vessel was designed to be a troopship, ordered by the United States Shipping Board (USSB) from Bethlehem Shipbuilding Corporation, Sparrows Point, Maryland, and laid down in 1920 as Berrien. Renamed Hawkeye State the ship was launched on 17 April 1921 and given the United States official number 220987. The ship, hull number 4180 and the first of a series, was an Emergency Fleet Corporation (EFC) Design 1029 and one of eight contracted ships of the design for Bethlehem Shipbuilding of which five were built after cancellations. The Design 1029 ships were first known, along with the slightly smaller Design 1095 or "502s" built only by New York Shipbuilding Corporation, as the "State" ships, as all were given state nicknames until all but four were renamed by May 1922 for United States presidents. In later commercial service they were frequently known as the "535s" for their length overall.

Service History

Civilian service
On 5 March 1921 Hawkeye State, the largest combined passenger and cargo vessel of the USSB ever to put into a Pacific port, arrived in San Francisco to begin Matson Line service. Matson operated Hawkeye State between Baltimore and Honolulu via the Panama Canal and California. In 1922, she passed to the Pacific Mail Steamship Company, which was taken over by Robert Dollar in 1925. She was then transferred to Dollar Steamship Company, which renamed her President Pierce. In 1938, Dollar was reorganised as American President Lines.

Routes with Dollar Lines
Dollar Line put President Pierce on trans-Pacific services between San Francisco and the Far East until 1931, when she was switched to a round-the-world service. Her first circumnavigation began at New York on 19 November 1931, going via the Panama Canal, California, Japan, China, Malaya, Ceylon, the Suez Canal, the Mediterranean and thence back to New York. She completed a total of five such trips, beginning her final one from New York on 2 June 1933.

SS President Hoover
Early on the morning of 11 December 1937, a much larger Dollar Lines ship, the ocean liner , ran aground in a typhoon on Kasho-to, east of Formosa. Hoovers 330 crew got their 503 passengers and themselves safely ashore without loss, but the 853 people now needed to be taken off the remote island. The task was shared between President Pierce and American Mail Line's SS President McKinley. Pierce collected the remaining 200 people on 15 December.

War service
On 31 July 1941, President Pierce was delivered by American President Lines to the War Department at San Francisco for operation by the US Army, which renamed her USAT Hugh L. Scott after General Hugh L. Scott, who was Army Chief of Staff 1914–17 and interim Secretary of War February—March 1916. The ship made one round trip to Honolulu before voyaging to Manila and redelivered to American President Lines for a special State Department mission to Hong Kong and Shanghai. In late October she returned to San Francisco by way of Manila to make one more round trip to Manila returning to San Francisco 25 December 1941. The ship made two trips to Australia in early 1942 and was then ordered to the US East Coast arriving at New York in July 1942.

On 14 August 1942, she was transferred to the US Navy and converted into an attack transport by Tietjen and Long of Hoboken, New Jersey. On 7 September 1942, she was commissioned as USS Hugh L. Scott, under the command of Captain Harold J. Wright.

Hugh L. Scott took part in Operation Torch, the Allied invasion of French North Africa. As part of Transport Division 3 (TransDiv 3), she sailed on 24 October after intensive amphibious training. She approached the beaches at Fedhala, French Morocco, early on the morning of 8 November and landed her troops. She then cleared the immediate invasion area and did not return until 11 November, when she entered the refueling area and then anchored in the exposed Fedhala roadstead to unload her supplies.

Sunk by U-boat
The Naval Battle of Casablanca delayed the off-loading of Hugh L. Scotts cargo and her departure from the Moroccan coast. On the evening of 11 November,  slipped inside the protective screen and torpedoed transport , tanker  and destroyer . Hugh L. Scott and the other transports were at battle stations all night and resumed unloading the next day.

Hugh L. Scott, hit on the starboard side, burst into flames and foundered, but owing to the availability of landing craft for rescue, casualties were limited to eight officers and 51 men. U-173 was later sunk by destroyers, but U-130 escaped.

References

External links

 

1921 ships
Design 1029 ships
Design 1029 ships of the United States Army
Design 1029 ships of the United States Navy
Maritime incidents in November 1942
Ships built in Sparrows Point, Maryland
Ships sunk by German submarines in World War II
World War II auxiliary ships of the United States
World War II shipwrecks in the Mediterranean Sea